Ink Master is an American reality competition television series that originally aired on Paramount Network (formerly called Spike), premiering on January 17, 2012. The show features tattoo artists who compete in various challenges assessing their tattooing and related artistic skills. They are judged by renowned tattoo artists and enthusiasts, with one or more contestants eliminated each episode. The last contestant standing each season receives a $100,000 prize, the title of Ink Master, and a feature in Inked Magazine. The series is produced by Original Media, which also produced the reality show Miami Ink.

Three spin-off shows, titled Ink Master: Redemption, Ink Master: Angels and Ink Master: Grudge Match, have also been released. The series has also released a number of special standalone episodes themed around upcoming events or holidays, such as Halloween.

The tenth season (titled as Ink Master: Return of the Masters) premiered on January 9, 2018, and aired its first two episodes on Spike before the network rebranded as the Paramount Network. On April 24, 2018, it was announced that Paramount Network had renewed the series for an eleventh season. The twelfth season, titled Ink Master: Battle of the Sexes, premiered on June 11, 2019. On November 12, 2019, it was announced that the thirteenth season titled Ink Master: Turf War would premiere on January 7, 2020.

On September 22, 2020, Paramount Network cancelled the series, as part of the network's then-planned shift to movies. On December 1, 2020, the first two seasons were made available to stream on Netflix in the United States. They were later removed on December 1, 2021, and replaced with seasons three and four. On February 24, 2021, it was announced that the series would be revived by Paramount+. On August 5, 2022, it was announced that the revival would premiere on September 7, 2022.

Show format

Basic format
All episodes aside from the finales have the following format, with some minor variations to the application of the format:

First, a Flash Challenge will be evaluated based on how well an artist met the week's skill. Some Flash Challenges involve tattooing, but typically, flash challenges do not incorporate the act of tattooing; but instead will require a non-related artistic skill (i.e., painting, haircutting, etching, burning, etc.) The winner of the flash challenge wins the right to select their human canvas in the elimination challenge and, as of season two, pair up the other contestants with their human canvases.

After the Flash Challenge comes the Elimination Challenge, a further test of the week's skill on a human canvas, typically incorporating a prominent style of tattooing. Once the contestants are paired up with their canvases, they are given the day to consult with their assignment. Each contestant is given four to six hours to tattoo their design the next day. Once completed, the contestants meet as a group with the judges and are critiqued one by one. The contestants then are dismissed, with four later being called back. The four typically represent a week's top two and bottom two, though this breakdown can change. At the end of each episode, a winner generally is declared, and one contestant is eliminated.

Special format
The final challenge was a marathon tattooing of up to 18 hours for the finale of season one. The season two finale did not share this format. Instead, it consisted of the three finalists meeting with their respective canvases for four six-hour sessions to create a final piece. This final piece did not require a specific tattoo genre or location for the artist to tattoo. Instead, the artists could choose those aspects for themselves, and the only restriction they faced was a time limit. The season three finale followed a similar format to the season two finale. However, the artists were allowed five seven-hour sessions for a cumulative 35-hour master canvas tattoo.

Judging
Musician Dave Navarro and tattoo artists Chris Núñez and Oliver Peck served as the show's primary judges, with Navarro also serving as a host for the show. Navarro and Núñez appeared in every episode, while Peck was absent on two episodes of season nine when he was recovering from a heart attack. Some episodes incorporate a fourth guest judge, usually a well-known tattoo artist who has knowledge or reputation in the style of tattoo (such as New School, Traditional (old school), Japanese, Portrait, Black and Gray, etc.) chosen for the week's elimination challenge.

Season two judging was taken to a new level with audience voting participation through the series' official website and via Facebook voting, with the audience vote affecting the final ruling by the judges. Sebastian Murphy was eliminated from consideration by the judges in the season finale because he was the contestant whose work in the elimination challenges received the fewest votes by the audience. Season three introduced the human canvas jury. The human canvases review each other's tattoos and nominate the artist who did the worst piece for elimination. Season four introduced the elimination challenge winner's selection, where the challenge winner picks an artist for elimination.

In January 2020, Oliver Peck was forced out of his spot as Ink Master Judge following a controversy involving his reemerged blackface photo from his MySpace page. There was no word of a replacement before the series was initially canceled.

On August 5, 2022, new judges were announced for the revival series, including season 8 winner, Ryan Ashley Malarkey, tattoo artists Nikko Hurtado and Ami James. Joel Madden was announced as the new host for the upcoming season, with Navarro returning as "Master Of Chaos", adding twists and game-changing bombs to each episode.

Seasons

Specials
Various standalone holiday and special event-themed episodes have been made that do not follow the series seasons. They have typically followed an upcoming or recently passed holiday. These episodes feature previous Ink Master contestants competing for smaller cash prizes. 

Ink Master licensed a Dutch/Belgian edition called Ink Master: Meesters van de Lage Landen (Masters of the Low Countries) to Spike NL in 2017. The format remains largely intact; filming occurs mainly around Amsterdam. The winner of the first season of this edition was the Belgian contestant "Djoels". The second season takes place in IJmuiden and was won by Belgian contestant Joyce.

Spin-offs

Ink Master: Redemption
The spin-off series Ink Master: Redemption premiered in September 2015. The spin-off features canvases who are unhappy with the tattoo they received during the competition. After discussing their tattoo with Navarro, the canvases are given a chance to confront the artist who did the original piece. The artist is offered the chance for redemption by being able to consult with the canvas on a new tattoo (or modification to improve their existing Ink Master piece). After reviewing the artist's new drawing, the canvas is given a no-strings-attached choice to proceed with the new tattoo or leave the shop. Episodes sometimes feature a twist, such as rival artists returning to draw a design for the same unhappy canvas, potentially stealing the original artist's chance at redemption. Ink Master: Redemption was renewed for a second season to coincide with the premiere of season 7 of Ink Master.

Ink Master: Angels

In June 2017, Spike announced a new spin-off series titled Ink Master: Angels. The premise follows four female contestants from the eighth season of Ink Master – season winner Ryan Ashley Malarkey, Kelly Doty, Nikki Simpson, and Gia Rose – as they travel around the United States to face other artists in tattoo challenges with a spot on season ten of Ink Master on the line. The show premiered on October 3, 2017.

Ink Master: Grudge Match
On August 21, 2019, it was announced that a spin-off titled Ink Master: Grudge Match would premiere on October 1, 2019. Judges for the series include former Ink Master contestants Cleen Rock One, DJ Tambe, and Ryan Ashley Malarkey.

See also

 List of tattoo TV shows

References

External links
 
 
 

Ink Master
2012 American television series debuts
2020 American television series endings
2010s American reality television series
2020s American reality television series
English-language television shows
Spike (TV network) original programming
Tattooing television series
Paramount Network original programming
Paramount+ original programming
American television series revived after cancellation
Reality competition television series